Mons Gruithuisen Gamma (γ) is a lunar dome that lies to the north of the crater Gruithuisen at the western edge of the Mare Imbrium.

This massif is shaped as a rounded dome in the surface, occupying a diameter of 20 km and climbing gently to a height of over 1500 meters. At the crest is a small crater. 

This formation appears foreshortened when viewed from the Earth, and it has been described by Antonin Rukl as resembling an "upturned bathtub".  

To the east lies the similar Mons Gruithuisen Delta (δ).  Together they are often informally called the Gruithuisen domes.

Mons Gruithuisen Gamma is the landing site for Peregrine Mission One, which will occur in 2023.

See also
 List of mountains on the Moon by height
 Volcanism on the Moon

References

External links
 Gruithuisen Domes - Constellation Region of Interest, Lunar Reconnaissance Orbiter article
 New Views of the Gruithuisen Domes, Lunar Reconnaissance Orbiter article

Gruithuisen Gamma
Volcanoes on the Moon